Syngnathus safina is a pipefish species which inhabits the western part of the Indian Ocean, the Gulf of Aqaba. It is a marine oceanic demersal fish.

References

safina
Fish of the Red Sea
Fish of Asia
Fish described in 1992